1355 Magoeba, provisional designation , is a Hungaria asteroid and a suspected contact-binary from the innermost regions of the asteroid belt, approximately 5 kilometers in diameter. It was discovered on 30 April 1935, by English-born, South African astronomer Cyril Jackson at the Johannesburg Observatory in South Africa. The asteroid is named for Magoeba, a tribal chief in the South African Transvaal Province.

Orbit and classification 

Magoeba is a member of the Hungaria family, which forms the innermost dense concentration of asteroids in the Solar System. It orbits the Sun in the inner main-belt at a distance of 1.8–1.9 AU once every 2 years and 6 months (922 days). Its orbit has an eccentricity of 0.04 and an inclination of 23° with respect to the ecliptic. The first precovery was taken at Nice Observatory just 3 day prior to its official discovery. The body's observation arc begins at Johannesburg the night after its discovery observation.

Physical characteristics

Lightcurves 

Between 2006 and 2014, several rotational lightcurves of Magoeba were obtained by American astronomer Brian Warner at the CS3–Palmer Divide Station in California. Lightcurve analysis of the photometric observations taken during the asteroid's 2014-apparition gave a rotation period of 2.971 hours with a brightness variation of 0.09 magnitude.

Previously derived periods varied strongly (5.99 and 31.65 hours) with alternative period solutions. The Observation were taken at the Palmer Divide Observatory in Colorado (see video in ). It is now suspected that this discrepancy might be caused by the presence of an asteroid moon that orbits Magoeba with a period of 15.05 hours.

Diameter and albedo 

According to the survey carried out by NASA's Wide-field Infrared Survey Explorer with its subsequent NEOWISE mission, Magoeba measures 4.276 and 4.828 kilometers in diameter, and its surface has an albedo of 0.582 and 0.466, respectively, while a polarimetric study of Hungaria asteroids found a lower albedo of 0.267. The Collaborative Asteroid Lightcurve Link assumes an albedo of 0.30 – a compromise value between 0.4 and 0.2, corresponding to the Hungaria asteroids both as family and orbital group – and calculates a diameter of 5.96 kilometers with an absolute magnitude of 13.05.

Spectral type 

In the Tholen taxonomy, Magoeba is an X-type asteroid, which can be further divided into the bright E, the metallic M and the carbonaceous P classes, with similar spectra but very different inferred mineralogies. It has both been classified as an E-type asteroid by the WISE/NEOWISE mission, and as a M-type asteroid by a dedicated spectroscopic survey at the Argentinian Lencito Complex, respectively.

Naming 

This minor planet was named for Magoeba, a native chief of the North Transvaal in South Africa. The official  was published by the Minor Planet Center in April 1953.

Notes

References

External links 
  
 Dynamical evolution of the Hungaria asteroids
 Asteroid Lightcurve Database (LCDB), query form (info )
 Dictionary of Minor Planet Names, Google books
 Asteroids and comets rotation curves, CdR – Observatoire de Genève, Raoul Behrend
 Discovery Circumstances: Numbered Minor Planets (1)-(5000) – Minor Planet Center
 
 

001355
Discoveries by Cyril Jackson (astronomer)
Named minor planets
001355
19350430
001355